Satchel's Pizza is a restaurant in Gainesville, Florida. It was opened on March 7, 2003 by Satchel Raye.

Satchel's has become very well known in Gainesville, and can have wait times of over an hour on the weekends. It is common for Gainesville residents to see bumper stickers from Satchel's when driving around town.

History

Satchel's was opened on March 7, 2003 by Satchel Raye, the founder and owner of the restaurant.

Restaurant fire
On February 28, 2012, the restaurant caught fire. It reopened on June 14 of the same year. During the downtime, Satchel Raye used Indiegogo to raise funds for its 47 employees. Nearly 700 people made contributions in a 16-day period, providing a total of $37,696 to the restaurant.

Gift shop fire
On December 5, 2016, the restaurant's outdoor seating area and gift shop, known as Lightnin' Salvage, caught fire and was destroyed. The restaurant itself was unharmed and remained open. In November 2017, Raye announced plans to reopen Lightnin' Salvage as a two-story building.

The gift shop and live music venue reopened on December 5, 2017. A grand reopening event was later held on June 1, 2018.

Expansion
In 2018, a new outdoor playground was built by University of Florida architecture students.

In February 2020, Raye announced that he would be opening a second location named Satch² in a downtown food park. The new location was officially opened on July 20, 2020.

In May 2022, the University of Florida's new food provider Chartwells proposed the creation of a Satchel's Pizza location on campus during their contract negotiations.

Community involvement
Satchel's Pizza has periodically organized fundraisers for local and national charities, including a $4,000 donation to Girls on the Run.

References

Culture of Gainesville, Florida
Buildings and structures in Gainesville, Florida
Restaurants in Florida
2003 establishments in Florida
Restaurants established in 2003